Mapou is a name.

List of people with the name 

 Mapou Yanga-Mbiwa (born 1989), French professional footballer
 Louis Mapou (born 1958), New Caledonian president
 Marius Mapou (born 1980), New Caledonian footballer

See also 

 Mapou (village)
 Myrsine australis

Surnames of Oceanian origin